The Yates Professorship of Classical Art and Archaeology is an endowed chair in  classical archaeology at University College London. The chair is named in honour of James Yates (1789-1871), whose fortune was used to endow the chair in 1880.

Yates Professors of Classical Art and Archaeology:

 Charles Thomas Newton (1880-1888)
 Reginald Stuart Poole (1889–1895)
 Ernest Arthur Gardner (1896-1929)
 Bernard Ashmole (1929-1948)
 Martin Robertson (1948-1961)
 Peter Edgar Corbett (1961-1982)
 Nicolas Coldstream (1982-1992)
 John Wilkes (1992-2001)

References
 http://www.ucl.ac.uk/library/Newsletter/issue31/

Professorships at University College London